Live at Hammersmith '84 is a live album by Jethro Tull, recorded on Sunday 9 September 1984 at the Hammersmith Odeon in London. It was the fourth release in an official series of similar, radio-archive releases by several bands (see Raw Fruit Records), this title being released in 1990. The tracks had been recorded for broadcast by BBC Radio, receiving their first broadcast on 27 December 1984 and were released under licence.

The original vinyl release had the catalogue number Raw Fruit Records FRSLP004 A1 B1. It was also released on cassette and CD.

Personnel
 Ian Anderson – flute, acoustic guitar, vocals
 Martin Barre – electric guitar
 Doane Perry  – drums
 Peter-John Vettese – keyboards
 Dave Pegg – bass

Track listing

Notes
 Recorded during the Under Wraps tour of 1984.
 At Hammersmith Odeon for three successive performances beginning 7 September 1984.

References

External links
 
 1984 Jethro Tull Concert Schedule
  Complete original concert at Wolfgang's Vault

BBC Radio recordings
Jethro Tull (band) live albums
1990 live albums
Albums recorded at the Hammersmith Apollo